Maranatha F.C. is a Togolese football club based in Fiokpo. They play in the top division in Togolese football. Their home stadium is Stade Général Ameyi.

References

External links 

Football clubs in Togo
Association football clubs established in 1997
1997 establishments in Togo